Theophylact Rhangabe or Theophylaktos Rhangabe, was a Byzantine Greek admiral, and the father of the emperor Michael I Rhangabe (ruled 811–813).

Life
He is known only from his participation, along with several other high-ranking officials, in a failed conspiracy in 780 to wrest the throne from Empress-regent Irene and to raise in her stead Nikephoros, the eldest surviving son of Constantine V (r. 741–775). At the time, he held the post of droungarios (admiral) of the Dodekanesos (roughly the southern Aegean Sea). After the plot was discovered, Irene had the conspirators publicly whipped, tonsured and banished.

References

Sources
 
 
 

8th-century Byzantine military personnel
Byzantine admirals
8th-century Byzantine monks
Rangabe family
Byzantine exiles
Byzantine rebels